Context is a real estate development company focused on high-rise residential developments in downtown Toronto. It was founded in 1997 by Stephen Gross and Howard Cohen. The name was chosen as each project fits in the context of the neighbourhood that surrounds it. Context is known for urban design and contemporary architecture. They have worked with the Toronto architecture firm architectsAlliance on several condominium developments.

Projects 

 20 Niagara
 150 Dan Leckie Way
 501 Adelaide Street East
 District Lofts
 Home
 Ideal Condominium
 Kensington Market Lofts
 Lawrence Heights
 Library District Condominiums
 Market Wharf
 Mozo
 Radio City
 Spire The Condominium
 The Loretto
 The Yorkdale Condominiums
 The Yorkdale Townhomes On The Park
 Tip Top Lofts
 Upper East Side
 Wynford Green

External links

References

Real estate companies of Canada